The men's skeleton event at the 2014 Winter Olympics took place at the Sliding Center Sanki on 14–15 February.

The gold medal won in this event featured Chelyabinsk meteor fragments to commemorate the first anniversary of this meteor strike.

Competition
In the first run, Aleksandr Tretyakov established the track record (55.95) and the start record (4.47).

Results
TR – Track Record. Top finish in each run is in boldface.

On 22 November 2017, gold medalist Aleksandr Tretyakov was stripped of his gold medal. On 27 November 2017, the results by Sergey Chudinov were annulled as well. On 1 February 2018, their results were restored as a result of the decision of CAS

References

Skeleton at the 2014 Winter Olympics
Men's events at the 2014 Winter Olympics